The 2008–09 Belgian Hockey League season was the 89th season of the Belgian Hockey League, the top level of ice hockey in Belgium. Six teams participated in the league, and HYC Herentals won the championship.

Regular season

Playoffs

References
Season on hockeyarchives.info

Belgian Hockey League
Belgian Hockey League seasons
Bel